Joulupöytä (translating to "Yule table") is the traditional assortment of foods served at Christmas in Finland. It contains many different dishes, most of them typical for the season.

The main dish is usually a large Christmas ham, which is eaten with mustard.  The ham is served with beetroot-carrot-potato-salad called rosolli, mushroom salad and casserole (laatikko) made with swede, carrot or potato or all three kind of casseroles, occasionally also a liver casserole. Gravlax and herring is also often served, and sometimes lutefisk (lipeäkala) along with boiled potatoes, peas and ryebread.

Christmas dessert consists of prune jam tarts, gingerbread and rice porridge with plum kisel. The traditional dessert beverage is alcoholic or non-alcoholic mulled wine (glögi in Finnish).

Dishes
Most popular dishes in Finnish Christmas table are:
Christmas ham with mustard
Rutabaga casserole
Carrot casserole 
Potato casserole (sweetened or not, depending on the region and preference) 
Rosolli - salad from boiled beetroots, carrots, potatoes, usually also apples and pickled cucumber. Served with a sour cream based sauce and sometimes with eggs or herring 
Potatoes (boiled or smashed)
Rye bread
Lax (usually Gravlax), Pickled herring and roe, often served with chopped onion and sour cream
Mushroom salad 
Boiled peas
Liver casserole 
Karelian stew 
Lipeäkala with melted butter and white sauce

Beverages
Beverages most often served are:

Schnapps such as Koskenkorva Viina as an appetizer
Beer. Most Finnish breweries have also seasonal beers for Christmas. Homemade non-alcoholic beer is also common.
Milk
Mulled wine (glögi) either alcoholic or non-alcoholic

Desserts
Most popular desserts in Finnish Christmas table are:

Prune jam pastries also known as joulutorttu
Gingerbread called piparkakku - commonly as flower or star shaped, and sometimes even as 3-dimensional houses, that are decorated with sugar 
Confectioneries and other sweets, especially chocolates and fruit marmalade candies
Rice porridge (riisipuuro) with cinnamon, sugar and cold milk or with raisin or mixed fruit soup (Usually the rice porridge is served from a large, common kettle and an almond has been hidden in it. The one who gets the almond gets his or her Christmas presents first or gets a wish. Sometimes rice porridge is served as breakfast.)
Glögi, glögi is usually served with almonds and raisins in it and is alcoholic or non-alcoholic 
Mixed fruit soup or kiisseli which is a plum runny dessert commonly served with rice porridge or sometimes with whipped cream
Fruit- date- or other type of cake
Coffee - the Finns prefer a mild roast; tea is less common.

References

Finnish Christmas recipe links by Santa Club
Christmas cookbook by thisisFINLAND

Christmas in Finland
Finnish cuisine
Christmas food
Christmas meals and feasts
Yule